Rodrigo da Rocha Borges (born 5 August 1998) is a Portuguese footballer who plays for Oliveirense as a defender.

References

External links

1998 births
Sportspeople from Braga
Living people
Portuguese footballers
Association football defenders
Merelinense F.C. players
S.C. Braga B players
U.D. Oliveirense players
Campeonato de Portugal (league) players
Liga Portugal 2 players